Vladimir Leonidovich Bogdanov (born 28 May 1951) is a Russian businessman and oil tycoon.

Biography and career
In 1973 he graduated from Tyumen Industrial Institute with a degree in oil and gas and since then has worked in oil industry in Tyumen Oblast, mainly in Surgutneftegas. Since 1993, he is the President of Surgutneftegas, one of the largest Russian oil companies. In 1978-1980 he occupied leading positions in Yuganskneftegaz. Since 1984 he has been the Director General of Surgutneftegas, which became a private company in 1993. In June 2001 Forbes claimed that Bogdanov was the third wealthiest Russian with $1.6 billion. He has been a member of the Khanty-Mansi legislature since 1996.

Bogdanov was also a confidant of Sergey Sobyanin during the successful 2001 Tyumen Oblast Governor election and of Vladimir Putin during the 2004 Russian Presidential Election.

In April 2018, the United States imposed sanctions on him and 23 other Russian nationals.

In April 2022, in response to the Russian invasion of Ukraine, Bogdanov was added to the European Union sanctions list "in response to the ongoing unjustified and unprovoked Russian military aggression against Ukraine and other actions undermining or threatening the territorial integrity, sovereignty and independence of Ukraine".

Honours and awards
 Order "For Merit to the Fatherland":
2nd class (28 May 2006) - for outstanding contribution to the development of fuel-energy complex and long conscientious work
3rd class (5 June 2001) - for outstanding contribution to the development of oil and gas industry and many years of diligent work
4th class (14 October 1997) - for services to the state, many years of hard work and great contribution to strengthening friendship and cooperation between nations
 Order of the Red Banner of Labour
 Order of the Badge of Honour

References

External links
Biography by Vladimir Pribylovsky (in Russian)

1951 births
Living people
People from Tyumen Oblast
Recipients of the Order "For Merit to the Fatherland", 2nd class
Recipients of the Order "For Merit to the Fatherland", 3rd class
Recipients of the Order "For Merit to the Fatherland", 4th class
Recipients of the Order of Honour (Russia)
Recipients of the Order of the Red Banner of Labour
State Prize of the Russian Federation laureates
Russian billionaires
Russian businesspeople in the oil industry
Russian individuals subject to the U.S. Department of the Treasury sanctions
Russian individuals subject to European Union sanctions